See also Dottie Rambo discography
This is a list of songs written by the American gospel songwriter Dottie Rambo. Rambo wrote over 2500 songs throughout her lifetime, and many have been recorded by hundreds of artists.

Songs are listed in alphabetical order and followed in parentheses by other notable artists who have recorded or performed the song.



A
Ain't Gonna Let The Mountains Praise The Lord
Ain't It Good To See The Sunshine Again
And That's The Way It Was
Angels Sound The Golden Trumpet
Another Mountain, Another Valley
Artist, The
As Long As We Can Talk It Over
As Long As You Walk With Me

B
Before You Die
Behold The Lamb (David Phelps, Dottie Rambo and The Christ Church Choir) 
Being Me
Between Here And Sunset
Big House On The Hill
Big, Big Man
Billy
Brand New Breed Of Believers, A
Brand New Feeling, A
Breaking Bread
Bring All Your Needs To The Altar (Jimmy Swaggart)
Build My Mansion (Next Door to Jesus)
By And By The Night Will Vanish

C
Camp Goo-la-Mock-EE
Castaway
Caught In The Middle And Holding
Church Triumphant, The
Closer Home
Come Spring (Gaither Homecoming)
Constantly Aware Of His Love
Cup of Woe

D
Dad's Grave
Dark Valley
Destined For The Throne
Don't It Make You Feel Little
Don't Let Me Walk Too Far from Calvary (Connie Smith)
Don't Lift The Anchor
Don't Pick Up The Pieces
Don't Take Jesus (He's Life To Me)
Don't Take My Cross Away
Don't Wish The Good Times Away
Down By The Creek Bank

E
End Of The Story, The
Entrance Music
Eternity Will Be Long Enough

F
Father Dear I'm Coming Home
Fill In The Blanks
First Million Years
First Time I Heard About Heaven, The
First Time I'll Be Home
Flesh Of My Flesh, Bone Of My Bone
Foggin' In My Noggin'
Follow The Leader
For The Rest Of Your Life
For What Earthly Reason (Janet Paschal)
Frog With A Freckle
From Earth To Somewhere
Full Up No Vacancy

G
Garden Of My Heart, The
Germs (My Invisible Dog)
Gettin' To Know You Better
Ginny Is Afraid Of The Dark
Give Him All The Glory
God Has No Certain Dwelling Place
God, Could You Use Another Kid On Your Team?
God, Make Me Proud Of My Country
God's House Of Rest
Going Through And Growing Through The Trials
Going To A Wedding
Going Toward The Setting Of The Sun
Good Lord Walks With Me, The
Good Ole Days, The
Grand Dot Grace
Grass Is Greener On The Other Side, The

H
Harbor In The Time Of Storm
Harvest, The
He Ain't Never Done Me Nothing But Good (Carol Channing)
He Changed My Tears To Showers Of Blessings
He Could See The Eagle In Me
He Has A Name
He Hasn't Lost His Touch
He Held On When Your Arms Let Me Go
He Just Takes Me
He Knows Just When To Give The Song
He Looked Beyond My Fault And Saw My Need (Andraé Crouch, Jerry Lee Lewis, The Oak Ridge Boys)
He Loved Me To Death
He Must Die
He Never Once Stopped Believing In Me
He Never Sends Me Where He's Never Been
He Plants Me Like A Seed
He Restoreth My Soul (In the Valley)
He Sees Me Through The Blood
He Waits For The Sound Of My Voice
He Was The Talk Of The Town
He Went Out Of His Way
He's Already On His Way
Headed For Judgment
Healer's Comin' Down The Road, The
Heaven Will Never Welcome A Sweeter Mama
His Name Is A Strong Tower
His Steps Didn't Stop At Calvary
Holy Hills Of Heaven Call Me, The (Gaither Homecoming, Vestal Goodman)
Holy Spirit Thou Art Welcome In This Place
Home Never Looked So Good To Me
Home's Where The Heart Is
How Graciously Grace Has Covered My Sin
Hymn From Way Back Home

I
I Am Adopted
I Call Him Lord (Mark Lowry)
I Can Rise Above It
I Don't Have The Heart
I Don't Want To Do Anything
I Found My Place
I Gave Him Nothing 'Til I Gave Him All
I Gave It All Away
I Go To The Rock (Danniebelle Hall, Whitney Houston, Aaron Jeoffrey, The Crabb Family)
I Have Hope
I Hear The Sound Of Rain
I Heard Footsteps
I Just Came Into His Presence
I Just Came To Talk With You Lord (Gaither Homecoming)
I Love The Name
I Still Believe
I Tell My Secrets To The Lord
I Want To Live So I Can Die Right
I Will Glory In The Cross (Larnelle Harris)
I Will Lift You There
I Will Never Turn Back
I Will Not Overshadow
I Wonder If The Angels Could Use Another Singer
I Won't Ask For More
If Heaven's A Dream (Let Me Dream On)
If I Could Do It All Over Again
If I Were My Brother
If Jesus Is There
If That Isn't Love (Elvis Presley, The Imperials, George Beverly Shea)
I'll Only Love Him Forever
I'll Sleep Beside You Someday
I'll Still Feel The Same About You
I'm Allergic To Yellow Roses
I'm Gonna Leave Here Shoutin'
I'm Not A Mountain
I'm Longing To Go
I'm Only Gonna Be Here Long Enough
I'm Simply Lost For Words
In And Out
In One Mind
In The Beginning
Into The Holy Of Holies
Is That The Lights Of Home
Is There Anything I Can Do For You
It Will Pass
It's All In Jesus
It's Hard To Sing The Blues
It's Me Again Lord
I've Been Talkin' To The Lord About You
I've Learned To Lean On The Lord
I've Never Been This Homesick Before (Jason Crabb, Jessy Dixon)
I've Seen All This World (I Want To See)

J
Jesus Means Everything To Me
Jesus Thou Art Fairer To Me
Jesus! Star Of The Morning
Jubilee Band
Just Couldn't Cut the Bluegrass
Just Enough Heaven
Just For A Day
Just In Time
Just One Of A Kind (Hank Snow, Rhonda Vincent, Jim and Jesse)
Just Want To Thank You Sweet Lord (aka Thank You Sweet Lord)

K
Keep A Lamp Shining Bright
Keeper Of The Well (Cathedral Quartet)
Kind Shepherd, The
King Is Tried, The (Medley)

L
Lamb Of Glory
The Legend Continues
Let Go Of This World
Lights
Little Boy
Looks Like Everybody's Got A Kingdom
Lord Of Me
Lord, Do It Again
Lord, Walk With Me
Lost Years
Love Is
Love Letters

M
Made Up Mind
Makin' My Own Place
Mama Always Had A Song To Sing
Mama Rocked My Cradle
Mama's Teaching Angels How To Sing (The Isaacs)
Mama's Treasures
Marvelous Grace (The Imperials)
Mary Was The First One To Carry The Gospel
Maybe When The Sun Comes Up
Mercy Throne, The
Midnight In the Middle Of The Day
Million Treasures
Mom, You Don't Have To Call Me Everyday
Motion Pictures
Move Upon Us Oh Holy Spirit
Multiply
Must Be My Soul Givin' Away
My Altar
My Father Is A King
My Heart Can See
My Heart Is Fixed
My Old Friend
My Song Is New (My Story's Old)
My Unchanging Friend
My Visit To Heaven

N
Naaman
New Beulah Land, The
New Dedication, A
New Shoes
No Less A King
No Lock On My Mansion Door (Kingsmen Quartet)
Not Until
Nothing (a.k.a. There's Nothing My God Can't Do) (Vestal Goodman)
Nothing Like Home To Me
Now You Can Walk With Me

O
Oh Blessed Hope (Dottie Rambo, Steve Brock, Vestal Goodman)
Oil And The Wine, The
Old Home Place
On The Sunny Banks (The Oak Ridge Boys, Gaither Homecoming)
One Day Nearer Home
One Door To Heaven
One More Chance
One More Valley (Carol Channing, Bob Cain)
One Step At A Time
Other Side Of Me, The
Out To Sea
Overture

P–Q
Papa
Parables
Perfect Rose (The)
Prisoner Of Love (Chuck Wagon Gang)
Promises
Puzzles
Queen Of Paradise

R
Reach Out For The Life Line
Reach Out Your Hand
Reaching Around The World
Red Scarlet Cross, The
Remind Me Dear Lord (The Happy Goodman Family)
Resurrection Day
Ringing Of The Hammer, The
Road That Leads To Heaven, The
Running My Last Mile Home

S
Sailing Toward Home
Sandals, The
Scratch
Send In The Cloud
Senses
Sheltered In The Arms Of God (The Blackwood Brothers)
Shepherd Of The Hills
Silent Bells
Sing Alleluia To The Lamb
Sing Me A Song Of Tomorrow
So My Feet Can't Get Wet
Solid Gold
Somebody Else Will
Somebody Prayed For Me
Somebody Stepped On Board
Somebody's Busy (And I Think I Know Who It Is)
Someday Jesus Will Take Me Away
Son Is Shining
Sons Of Thunder, Daughters Of The Light
Soul Of Me, The
Soul Was Born, A
Souvenirs Of Yesterday
Speak Through Me
Stable Housed A Mighty King, The
Stand By The River
Stand Still And See His Glory
Still Small Voice, A
Sunday Is Father's Day
Sunshine Shine On
Superman, Superfriend
Sweet Mountain Mornin'

T
T.L.C.
Take Me For A Cleansing
Taste Of The Lamb, The
Teach Me To Pray
Tears Will Never Stain The Streets Of That City (The Crabb Family)
Thank You For The Valley
Thank You Sweet Lord
Thanks For Just Being You
That Same Road
That Was Before The Cross And The Crown
That's Just His Way (Of Telling Me He Loves Me)
The Holy Hills of Heaven Calls Me
Then You Can Walk With Me
There Is No Darkness In Him
There's Nothing My God Can't Do (co-written with Jimmie Davis)(Vestal Goodman)
They Didn't Take Him To Calvary
Things Are Gonna Be Better After While
Things I Learned At Mother's Knee, The
This Is My Father's World
This Is My Valley
This Little Sheep's Coming Home
Til There's A Mountain To Move
Tiny
Tiny Angel
Today Is Tomorrow's Yesterday
Tomorrow I May Be Home
Too Much To Gain To Lose (Connie Smith, The Talleys, Vestal Goodman)
Touch Of Mama's Hand, The
Touch Through Me
Touched With His Love
Traveling Man
Troubles Can Break You (Or Make You A Man)

U
Unlock My Mind, Take Back My Memories
Unmerited Favor Of God (The Talleys)
Until He Comes

W
Wait For An Answer
Waiting For The Son To Come on Down
Wars May Make Heroes (But Heroes Will Never Make War)
Was There Any Music
We Are Like Children (Lord Teach Us)
We Don't Have As Far To Go
We Shall Behold Him (Sandi Patty)
We're The Generation
West Kentucky Coalmines
We've Weathered Storms Before
What Can I Offer The Lord
What Will It Be Beyond The River
When All Goes Well
When His Kingdom Comes (Steve Green)
When I Lift Up My Head (Gaither Homecoming)
When Is He Coming Again
When Payday Comes
When We All Shall Gather There
Where Did All The Good Folks Go
Where Goes The Wind
Which Road Leads To Heaven
Who's Gonna Teach My Children's Children
Whole World Is A Vineyard, The
Whole World Is Singing, The
Wonder If Anyone Cares At All
World Needs Some Good News Bad, The
World's Gonna Know We've Been Here
Wounds Of Calvary, The

Y–Z
You Were My Way Back Home
You Will Have To Live The Song
You're Never There
Zacchæus

References 

Rambo